Martinsia is a genus of beetles in the family Cerambycidae, containing the following species:

 Martinsia cordigera Touroult, Dalens & Tavakilian, 2010
 Martinsia scabrosa Chemsak & Linsley, 1967

References

Xystrocerini